The House of Massalski (Plural: Massalscy, feminine form: Massalska), sometimes Masalski , Massalsky or Mosalsky, is a Polish-Lithuanian, Russian-Lithuanian princely family of Ruthenian origin from the Principality of Chernigov and based on the city of Mosalsk.

History 
The family descended from the Rurik dynasty. Their princely title was recognized in 1775. Living family members are members in the Confederation of the Polish Nobility.

Notable members 
 Aleksander Masalski (1593-1643), voivode of Minsk Voivodeship
 Andrzej Massalski (died 1651), voivode of Minsk Voivodeship
 Michał Józef Massalski, Great Hetman of Lithuania
 Ignacy Jakub Massalski, Bishop of Wilno
 Józef Adrian Massalski (1726-1765), marszałek of the Sejm
 Helena Apolonia Massalska (1763-1815), diarist
 Edward Tomasz Massalski (1799-1879), writer and  publicist
 Józef Massalski (1800-1845), poet

Palaces

References
 I. Lipiński, Massalscy – linia wołkowyska od XVI do początku XIX wieku, "Genealogia. Studia i materiały historyczne", t. 11, Poznań – Wrocław 1999, s. 21.
 Tomasz Lenczewski, Genealogie rodów utytułowanych w Polsce, t. 1, Warszawa 1996-1997, s. 54-66, fot. 10-13.

External links
 MASSALSCY